United Confectioners is a Russian confectionery holding.
Through its subsidiaries it produces chocolate bars, cakes, cookies and candies. The holding owns brands such as Krasny Oktyabr, Rot Front and Babayevsky. The company employed 17,000 people in 2013.

As of 2015 it was the 13th largest confectionery company worldwide, with sales of $2.2 billion. Until 2011 the company was partly owned by the city of Moscow, and it is currently part of the GUTA Group. In 2016 the company had a 20% share of the Russian confectionery market. In 2014 the company's products were removed from retail in Ukraine, in retaliation against similar actions taken against the Ukrainian confectioner Roshen.

References

External links
 Official website

 
Confectionery companies